Another Perfect Day may refer to:

 Another Perfect Day, 1983 album by Motörhead
 "Another Perfect Day" (song), the single from American Hi-Fi's self-titled debut album
 "Another Perfect Day", a single from the country music duo Blake & Brian
 "Another Perfect Day", a single from the Boom Boom Satellites album Embrace, used in Starship Troopers: Invasion
 "Another Perfect Day?", a single from the Electric Wizard album We Live